There have been 60 women in the Victorian Legislative Council since its establishment in 1856. Women have had the right to vote in Victoria, Australia since 1908 and the right to stand as a candidate for the Victorian Legislative Council since 1923. As of September 2020, there were 17 women in the 40 member Legislative Council.

The first successful female candidates for the Legislative Council were Gracia Baylor and Joan Coxsedge of the Liberal and Labor parties respectively, who were elected in 1979. Since then there have continuously been female members in the Council. The first National Party female member was Jeanette Powell, elected in 1996.

List of women in the Victorian Legislative Council
Names in bold indicate women who have been appointed as Ministers and Parliamentary Secretaries during their time in the Legislative Council. Names in italics indicate entry into Parliament through a by-election or by appointment and * symbolises members that have sat as members in both the Legislative Council and the Legislative Assembly.

Timeline

Proportion of women in the Council
Numbers and proportions are as they were directly after the beginning of Council terms and do not take into account deaths, resignations, appointments, defections or other changes in membership.

See also

 
 
Victoria